Kondapuram may refer to:
 Kondapuram, Kadapa district, a village in Kadapa district, Andhra Pradesh, India
 Kondapuram, Nellore district, a village in Nellore district, Andhra Pradesh, India